= Erie County Sheriff's Office =

Erie County Sheriff's Office could refer to several sheriffs departments in the United States, including:

- Erie County, New York Sheriff's Office
- Erie County, Ohio Sheriff's Office
- Erie County, Pennsylvania Sheriff's Office
